The Adelaide Guitar Festival (AGF), formerly the Adelaide International Guitar Festival (AGIF) is Australia's largest guitar festival, held biennially in the South Australian capital of Adelaide. The AGF is the sister event to the New York Guitar Festival, and features local, national and international artists across a variety of genres including rock, jazz, classical, experimental, blues and roots music.

First held in 2007, the AGF is held at the Adelaide Festival Centre. Slava Grigoryan has been artistic director since 2010.

Annual events associated with AGF are Guitars In Bars, Winter School, the Adelaide International Classical Guitar Competition and Resonance.

History
Following negotiations with the New York Guitar Festival's founder David Spelman, South Australian Premier Mike Rann announced in 2007 that Adelaide would stage the first Adelaide International Guitar Festival later in the year. It would be the sister festival to the New York Guitar Festival.

The AIGF began as part of the plan to make the Adelaide Festival Centre "the nation's most innovative arts hub". 
Spelman served as the founding artistic director for the Festival and continued to serve as an international program advisor. The ten-day festival was modelled on the New York Guitar Festival, and drew 30,000 people in the first year. The Adelaide Advertiser wrote that "never before have we had a festival like this... the Guitar Festival was a roaring success and an unqualified winner". Rolling Stone called it "a genuinely international event... curated by David Spelman, the man behind the world-famous New York Guitar Festival". Over 100 musicians from around the world performed in over 40 events, spanning many genres, with attendance at the ten-day festival in excess of 30,000.

In March 2009 it was announced that Slava Grigoryan had been appointed artistic director for the 2010 Festival. Grigoryan commented on his appointment, saying "it was a great honour for me to be asked to direct a Festival, with the guitar at its heart." On 30 March the Adelaide Festival Centre CEO, Douglas Gautier, along with Grigoryan, announced the festival was to become a biennial event, to ensure there was "more planning and lead time to secure artists and projects which excite audiences, partners and sponsors".

Past Festivals

2007 
The 2007 Festival was held from 23 November to 2 December.

2007 featured a number of local and international artists including: Ralph Towner, Jorma Kaukonen, The Assad Duo, Pepe Romero, The Atlantics, Richard Clapton, Beau Young, David Lindley, Kaki King, Vernon Reid, Bob Brozman, Cindy Cashdollar, Lucky Oceans, John Hammond Jnr and Fiona Boyes.

2008 
The 2008 Festival was held from 29 November to 7 December.

Artists who performed at the 2008 festival included:
The Romeros Guitar Quartet, Xavier Rudd, Adrian Belew, Hoodoo Gurus, The Derek Trucks Band, Lior, Troy Cassar-Daley, The Party Boys, Slava Grigoryan, Ash Grunwald, Grinspoon, Guy Pratt and Peter Denahy.

2010 
The 2010 Adelaide International Guitar Festival ran from 25–28 November and featured a variety of local and international artists including:
Manuel Barrueco, Richard Bona, Shawn Mullins, Dhafer Youssef, Wolfgang Muthspiel, Jeff Lang, Yamandu Costa, Pepe de Lucia, Oscar Guzman and more.

As part of the 2010 program the Festival hosted the inaugural Adelaide International Classical Guitar Competition. The winner was Jin-Hee Kim from South Korea, second-prize was awarded to Samuel Klemke from Germany and third place went to Tal Hurwitz from Israel.

2012 
The 2012 Adelaide International Guitar Festival ran from 9–12 August.

The 2012 festival included performances by:
John Scofield Trio, Punch Brothers, Ana Vidovic, Australian String Quartet, Edin Karamazov, Tommy Emmanuel, Caminos Flamencos, Paulo Bellinati & Weber Lopez and more.

The Adelaide International Classical Guitar Competition returned, and this year was won by former Adelaide University Elder Conservatorium of Music student Andrey Lebedev. Australia's Stephanie Jones came in second while third place went to Ekachai Jearakul from Thailand.

2014 
The 2014 Adelaide International Guitar Festival ran from 17–20 July.

The 2014 festival featured a range of local and international artists, including Pepe Romero, Yamandu Costa, Debashish Bhattacharya, Guthrie Govan, Jose Antonio Rodriguez Trio, Judicael Perroy, Maximo Pujol Trio, Stochelo Rosenberg Trio, Australian String Quartet and more, including the premiere of the Adelaide Guitar Festival Orchestra.

The third Adelaide International Classical Guitar Competition was won by Romania's Bogdan Milailescu, second place went to Brendan Evans with Callum Henshaw coming in third.

2016 
The Adelaide Guitar Festival took place 11–14 August 2016.

The fourth Adelaide International Classical Guitar Competition was won by Ukraine's Marko Topchii, second place went to Miles Johnston with Andrew Blanch coming in third.

2018
Taking place from 9 to 12 August, the 2018 event featured 20 international artists, with "five world premieres, two Australian premieres and four Adelaide premieres alongside workshops, artist talks, a guitar expo, masterclasses and more...". Performers included Tommy Emmanuel, Pedro Javier Gonzalez, Richard Smith, Tony McManus and Albert Lee, South African Derek Gripper, Kaki King and Marc Ribot. Perth's Abbe May and Adelaide locals Kelly Menhennett and Hana and Jessie-Lee also appeared. Julia Zemiro interviewed some of the musicians and hosted the festival finale.

Associated annual events

Guitars in Bars

Music SA it has run the annual Umbrella: Winter City Sounds event since 2016, growing each year. In association with the Adelaide Guitar Festival, it presents "Guitars in Bars" each year, as part of Umbrella. This event is open to everyone, and helps connect musicians with venues through a venue directory. Venues included a guitar store in Port Lincoln, a brewery on Yorke Peninsula, and a distillery in the Riverland in 2019.

Other events
In addition to Guitars In Bars, the Winter School, the Adelaide International Classical Guitar Competition and a program known as Resonance – where world-class musicians take their music to hospitals, aged care homes and community centres – are held annually.

References

External links 
 Official Website

Music festivals in Australia
Festivals in Adelaide